Silence Is Betrayal is First Blood's second full-length release. It was released in 2010 by Bullet Tooth Records.

Track listing

2010 albums
First Blood (band) albums